The 2005–06 Turkish Basketball League was the 40th season of the top-tier professional basketball league in Turkey. The season started on October 15, 2005. Ülkerspor won their fourth national championship this season.

Regular season standings 
Last updated May 31, 2006

Unfortunately, after this season Tuborg Pilsener and Büyük Kolej decided to withdraw from the Turkish Basketball League because of the financial problems. Erdemirspor and İ.T.Ü. relegated to Turkish Second Basketball League. Tofaş, Oyak Renault, Casa TED Kolejliler and Mutlu Akü Selçuk Üniversitesi have been promoted to the Turkish Basketball First League for the 2006–07 season.

Turkish Basketball League 2005–06 play-offs 

Last updated June 4, 2008

The 2006 Turkish Basketball League play-offs is the final phase of the 2005–06 regular season.

Quarterfinal and Semifinal series are 5-match series. The teams reaches the first 3 wins is through to the next round. The team which has won both regular season matchups starts with a 1–0 lead to the series.

Final series are 7-match series and the team reaches first 4 wins is the champion of the Turkish Basketball League.

2005–06 play-off seedings, results and schedules

Quarter finals 

(1) Ülkerspor (25–5) vs. (8) Galatasaray Café Crown (16–14) (Series starts 1–0)
 Game 1 11 May 2006, Istanbul: Ülkerspor: 70, Galatasaray Café Crown: 54 (2–0)
 Game 2 13 May 2006, Istanbul: Galatasaray Café Crown: 69, Ülkerspor: 79 (0–3)

Ülkerspor wins the series 3:0

(2) Efes Pilsen (24–6) vs. (7) Fenerbahçe (18–12) (Series starts 1–0)
 Game 1 10 May 2006, Istanbul: Efes Pilsen: 68, Fenerbahçe: 59 (2–0)
 Game 2 12 May 2006, Istanbul: Fenerbahçe: 72, Efes Pilsen: 74 (0–3)

Efes Pilsen wins the series 3:0

(3) Beşiktaş Cola Turka (23–7) vs. (6) Tekelspor (18–12) (Series starts 0–0)
 Game 1 10 May 2006, Istanbul: Beşiktaş Cola Turka: 86, Tekelspor: 70 (1–0)
 Game 2 12 May 2006, Istanbul: Beşiktaş Cola Turka: 91, Tekelspor: 76 (2–0)
 Game 3 14 May 2006, Istanbul: Tekelspor: 94, Beşiktaş Cola Turka: 87 (1–2)
 Game 4 16 May 2006, Istanbul: Tekelspor: 72, Beşiktaş Cola Turka: 73 (1–3)

Beşiktaş Cola Turka wins the series 3:1

(4) Bandırma Banvit (21–9) vs. (5) Türk Telekom (21–9) (Series starts 1–0)
 Game 1 10 May 2006, Bandırma: Bandırma Banvit: 83, Türk Telekom: 70 (2–0)
 Game 2 13 May 2006, Ankara: Türk Telekom: 90, Bandırma Banvit: 69 (1–2)
 Game 3 15 May 2006, Ankara: Türk Telekom: 77, Bandırma Banvit: 69 (2–2)
 Game 4 18 May 2006, Bandırma: Bandırma Banvit: 80, Türk Telekom: 76 (3–2)

Bandırma Banvit wins the series 3:2

Semifinals 

(1) Ülkerspor (25–5) vs. (4) Bandırma Banvit (21–9) (Series starts 0–0)
 Game 1 21 May 2006, Istanbul: Ülkerspor: 75, Bandırma Banvit: 67 (1–0)
 Game 2 24 May 2006, Istanbul: Ülkerspor: 72, Bandırma Banvit: 63 (2–0)
 Game 3 27 May 2006, Bandırma: Bandırma Banvit: 95, Ülkerspor: 82 (1–2)
 Game 4 29 May 2006, Bandırma: Bandırma Banvit: 78, Ülkerspor: 86 (1–3)

Ülkerspor wins the series 3:1

(2) Efes Pilsen (24–6) vs. (3) Beşiktaş Cola Turka (23–7) (Series starts 0–1)
 Game 1 20 May 2006, Istanbul: Efes Pilsen: 77, Beşiktaş Cola Turka: 55 (1–1)
 Game 2 23 May 2006, Istanbul: Beşiktaş Cola Turka: 55, Efes Pilsen: 61 (1–2)
 Game 3 26 May 2006, Istanbul: Beşiktaş Cola Turka: 57, Efes Pilsen: 55 (2–2)
 Game 4 28 May 2006, Istanbul: Efes Pilsen: 80, Beşiktaş Cola Turka: 63 (3–2)

Efes Pilsen wins the series 3:2

League Finals 

(1) Ülkerspor (25–5) vs. (2) Efes Pilsen (24–6) (Series starts 1–0)
 Game 1 2 June 2006, Istanbul: Ülkerspor: 72, Efes Pilsen: 65 (2–0)
 Game 2 4 June 2006, Istanbul: Efes Pilsen: 74, Ülkerspor: 78(ET) (0–3)
 Game 3 7 June 2006, Istanbul: Efes Pilsen: 62, Ülkerspor: 76 (0–4)

Ülkerspor wins the series 4:0

External links 
 Turkish Basketball League Official Website
 Turkish Basketball Federation Official Website
 TBLStat.net

References 

Turkish Basketball Super League seasons
Turkish
1